Geniocremnus is a genus of beetles belonging to the family Curculionidae.

Species:

Geniocremnus angustirostris 
Geniocremnus chiliensis 
Geniocremnus laticollis 
Geniocremnus villosus

References

Curculionidae